Wayne Alberts is an Australian former rugby league footballer who played in the 1980s professionally for the Gold Coast-Tweed Giants.

Playing career
In 1988 Alberts was in the inaugural side for the new Gold Coast-Tweed Giants franchise. He played in three other matches for the Giants that season.

In 1992 Alberts represented the Australian Aborigines side in the Pacific Cup. He was named in the team of the tournament at second row.

References

Living people
Australian Aboriginal rugby league team players
Australian rugby league players
Gold Coast Chargers players
Indigenous Australian rugby league players
Place of birth missing (living people)
Rugby league five-eighths
Rugby league players from Thursday Island
Year of birth missing (living people)